Bhongir Lok Sabha constituency is one of the 17 Lok Sabha constituencies in Telangana state in southern India.

Komatireddy Venkat Reddy of Indian National Congress is currently representing the constituency for the third time.

History
The constituency came into existence in 2008, following the implementation of delimitation of parliamentary constituencies based on the recommendations of the Delimitation Commission of India.

Assembly segments
Bhongir Lok Sabha constituency comprises the following Legislative Assembly segments:

Members of Parliament

Election Result

General Election, 2019

General Election, 2014

General Election, 2009

See also
 Nalgonda district

References

Lok Sabha constituencies in Telangana
Nalgonda district